Sustainable drainage systems (also known as SuDS, SUDS, or sustainable urban drainage systems) are a collection of water management practices that aim to align modern drainage systems with natural water processes and are part of a larger green infrastructure strategy. SuDS efforts make urban drainage systems more compatible with components of the natural water cycle such as storm surge overflows, soil percolation, and bio-filtration. These efforts hope to mitigate the effect human development has had or may have on the natural water cycle, particularly surface runoff and water pollution trends. 

SuDS have become popular in recent decades as our understanding of how urban development affects natural environments, as well as concern for climate change and sustainability, have increased. SuDS often use built components that mimic natural features in order to integrate urban drainage systems into the natural drainage systems or a site as efficiently and quickly as possible. SUDS infrastructure has become a large part of the Blue-Green Cities demonstration project in Newcastle-upon-Tyne.

History of drainage systems
Drainage systems have been found in ancient cities over 5,000 years old, including Minoan, Indus, Persian, and Mesopotamian civilizations. These drainage systems focused mostly on reducing nuisances from localized flooding and waste water. Rudimentary systems made from brick or stone channels constituted the extent of urban drainage technologies for centuries. Cities in Ancient Rome also employed drainage systems to protect low-lying areas from excess rainfall. When builders began constructing aqueducts to import fresh water into cities, urban drainage systems became integrated into water supply infrastructure for the first time as a unified urban water cycle. 

Modern drainage systems did not appear until the 19th century in Western Europe, although most of these systems were primarily built to deal with sewage issues rising from rapid urbanization. One such example is that of the London sewerage system, which was constructed to combat massive contamination of the River Thames. At the time, the River Thames was the primary component of London's drainage system, with human waste concentrating in the waters adjacent to the densely populated urban center. As a result, several epidemics plagued London's residents and even members of Parliament, including events known as the 1854 Broad Street cholera outbreak and the Great Stink of 1858. The concern for public health and quality of life launched several initiatives, which ultimately led to the creation of London's modern sewerage system designed by Joseph Bazalgette. This new system explicitly aimed to ensure waste water was redirected as far away from water supply sources as possible in order to reduce the threat of waterborne pathogens. Since then, most urban drainage systems have aimed for similar goals of preventing public health crises. 

Within past decades, as climate change and urban flooding have become increasingly urgent challenges, drainage systems designed specifically for environmental sustainability have become more popular in both academia and practice. The first sustainable drainage system to utilize a full management train including source control in the UK was the Oxford services motorway station designed by SuDS specialists Robert Bray Associates Originally the term SUDS described the UK approach to sustainable urban drainage systems. These developments may not necessarily be in "urban" areas, and thus the "urban" part of SuDS is now usually dropped to reduce confusion. Other countries have similar approaches in place using a different terminology such as best management practice (BMP) and low-impact development in the United States, water-sensitive urban design (WSUD) in Australia, low impact urban design and development (LIUDD) in New Zealand, and comprehensive urban river basin management in Japan.

The National Research Council's definitive report on urban stormwater management described that urban drainage systems began in the United States after World War II. These structures were based on simple catch basins and pipes to transfer the water outside of the cities. Urban stormwater management started to evolve more in the 1970s when landscape architects focused more on low-impact development and began using practices such as infiltration channels. Parallel to this time, scientists started becoming concerned with other stormwater hazards surrounding pollution. Studies such as the Nationwide Urban Runoff Program showed that urban runoff contained pollutants like heavy metals, sediments, and pathogens, all of which water can pick up as it flows off of impermeable surfaces. It was at the beginning of the 21st century where stormwater infrastructure to allow runoff to infiltrate close to the source became popular. This was around the same time that the term green infrastructure was coined.

Background 
Traditional urban drainage systems are limited by various factors including volume capacity, damage or blockage from debris and contamination of drinking water. Many of these issues are addressed by SuDS systems by bypassing traditional drainage systems altogether and returning rainwater to natural water sources or streams as soon as possible. Increasing urbanisation has caused problems with increased flash flooding after sudden rain. As areas of vegetation are replaced by concrete, asphalt, or roofed structures, leading to impervious surfaces, the area loses its ability to absorb rainwater. This rain is instead directed into surface water drainage systems, often overloading them and causing floods.

The goal of all sustainable drainage systems is to use rainfall to recharge the water sources of a given site. These water sources are often underlying the water table, nearby streams, lakes, or other similar freshwater sources. For example, if a site is above an unconsolidated aquifer, then SuDS will aim to direct all rain that falls on the surface layer into the underground aquifer as quickly as possible. To accomplish this, SuDS use various forms of permeable layers to ensure the water is not captured or redirected to another location. Often these layers include soil and vegetation, though they can also be artificial materials.

The paradigm of SuDS solutions should be that of a system that is easy to manage, requiring little or no energy input (except from environmental sources such as sunlight, etc.), resilient to use, and being environmentally as well as aesthetically attractive. Examples of this type of system are basins (shallow landscape depressions that are dry most of the time when it's not raining), rain gardens (shallow landscape depressions with shrub or herbaceous planting), swales (shallow normally-dry, wide-based ditches), filter drains (gravel filled trench drain), bioretention basins (shallow depressions with gravel and/or sand filtration layers beneath the growing medium), reed beds and other wetland habitats that collect, store, and filter dirty water along with providing a habitat for wildlife.

A common misconception of SuDS is that they reduce flooding on the development site. In fact the SuDS is designed to reduce the impact that the surface water drainage system of one site has on other sites.  For instance, sewer flooding is a problem in many places. Paving or building over land can result in flash flooding. This happens when flows entering a sewer exceed its capacity and it overflows. The SuDS system aims to minimise or eliminate discharges from the site, thus reducing the impact, the idea being that if all development sites incorporated SuDS then urban sewer flooding would be less of a problem. Unlike traditional urban stormwater drainage systems, SuDS can also help to protect and enhance ground water quality.

Example features
Because SuDS describe a collection of systems with similar components or goals, there is a large crossover between SuDS and other terminologies dealing with sustainable urban development. The following are examples generally accepted as components in a SuDS system: 

Bioswales

 

Permeable pavement

Wetlands

Artificial wetlands can be constructed in areas that see large volumes of storm water surges or runoff. Built to replicate shallow marshes, wetlands as BMPs gather and filter water at scales larger than bioswales or rain gardens. Unlike bioswales, artificial wetlands are designed to replicate natural wetlands processes as opposed to having an engineered mechanism within the artificial wetland. Because of this, the ecology of the wetland (soil components, water, vegetation, microbes, sunlight processes, etc.) becomes the primary system to remove pollutants. Water in an artificial wetland tends to be filtered slowly in comparison to systems with mechanized or explicitly engineered components.

Wetlands can be used to concentrate large volumes of runoff from urban areas and neighborhoods. In 2012, the South Los Angeles Wetlands Park was constructed in a densely populated inner-city district as a renovation for a former LA Metro bus yard. The park is designed to capture runoff from surrounding surfaces as well as storm water overflow from the city's current drainage system.
Detention basins

Green roofs

Rain gardens 
Rain gardens are a form of stormwater management using water capture. Rain gardens are shallow depressed areas in the landscape, planted with shrubs and plants that are used to collect rainwater from roofs or pavement and allows for the stormwater to slowly infiltrate into the ground . Rain gardens mimic natural landscape functions by capturing stormwater, filtering out pollutants, and recharging groundwater. A study done in 2008 explains how rain gardens and stormwater planters are easy to incorporate into urban areas where they will improve the streets by minimizing the effects of drought and helping out with stormwater runoff. Stormwater planters can easily fit between other street landscapes and ideal in areas where spacing is tight.

Downspout disconnection 
Downspout disconnection is a form of green infrastructure that separates roof downspouts from the sewer system and redirects roof water runoff into permeable surfaces. It can be used for storing stormwater or allowing the water to penetrate the ground. Downspout disconnection is especially beneficial in cities with combined sewer systems. With high volumes of rain, downspouts on buildings can send 12 gallons of water a minute into the sewer system, which increases the risk of basement backups and sewer overflows.

Benefits for stormwater management 
Green infrastructure keeps waterways clean and healthy in two primary ways; water retention and water quality. Different green infrastructure strategies prevents runoff by capturing the rain where it lies, allowing it to filter into the ground to recharge groundwater, return to the atmosphere through evapotranspiration, or be reused for another purpose like landscaping. Water quality is also improved by decreasing the amount of stormwater that reaches other waterways and removing contaminants. Vegetation and soil help capture and remove pollutants from stormwater in many ways like adsorption, filtration, and plant uptake. These processes break down or capture many of the common pollutants found in runoff.

Reduced flooding 
With climate change intensifying, heavy storms are becoming more frequent and so is the increasing risk of flooding and sewer system overflows. According to the EPA, the average size of a 100 year floodplain is likely to increase by 45% in the next ten years. Another growing problem is urban flooding being caused by too much rain on impervious surfaces, urban floods can destroy neighborhoods. They particularly affect minority and low-income neighborhoods and can leave behind health problems like asthma and illness caused by mold. Green infrastructure reduces flood risks and bolsters the climate resiliency of communities by keeping rain out of sewers and waterways, capturing it where it falls.

Increased water supply 
More than half of the rain that falls in urban areas covered mostly by impervious surfaces ends up as runoff. Green infrastructure practices reduce runoff by capturing stormwater and allowing it to recharge groundwater supplies or be harvested for purposes like landscaping. Green infrastructure promotes rainfall conservation through the use of capture methods and infiltration techniques, for instance bioswales. As much as 75 percent of the rainfall that lands on a rooftop can be captured and used for other purposes.

Heat management 
A city with miles of dark hot pavement absorbs and radiates heat into the surrounding atmosphere at a greater rate than a natural landscapes do. This is urban heat island effect causing an increase in air temperatures. The EPA estimates that the average air temperature of a city with one million people or more can be  warmer than surrounding areas. Higher temperatures reduce air quality by increasing smog. In Los Angeles, a 1 degree temperature increase makes the air roughly 3 percent more smog. Green roofs and other forms of green infrastructure help improve air quality and reduce smog through their use of vegetation. Plants not only provide shade for cooling, but also absorb pollutants like carbon dioxide and help reduce air temperatures through evaporation and evapotranspiration.

Health benefits 
By improving water quality, reducing air temperatures and pollution, green infrastructure provides many public health benefits. Cooler and cleaner air can help reduce heat related illnesses like exhaustion and heatstroke, as well as respiratory problems like asthma. Cleaner and healthier waterways also means less illness from contaminated waters and seafood. Greener areas also promote physical activity and can boost mental health.

Reduced costs 
Green infrastructure is often cheaper than more conventional water management strategies. Philadelphia found that its new green infrastructure plan will cost $1.2 billion over 25 years, compared with the $6 billion a gray infrastructure would have cost. The expenses for implementing green infrastructure are often smaller, planting a rain garden to deal with drainage costs less than digging tunnels and installing pipes. But even when it isn’t cheaper, green infrastructure still has a good long-term effect. A green roof lasts twice as long as a regular roof, and low maintenance costs of permeable pavement can make for a good long-term investment. The Iowa town of West Union determined it could save $2.5 million over the lifespan of a single parking lot by using permeable pavement instead of traditional asphalt. Green infrastructure also improves the quality of water drawn from rivers and lakes for drinking, which reduces the costs associated with purification and treatment, in some cases by more than 25 percent. And green roofs can reduce heating and cooling costs, leading to energy savings of as much as 15 percent.

See also
Aquifer storage and recovery
Blue roof
Detention basin
Drainage system (disambiguation)
French drain
Low-impact development (U.S. and Canada)
Rain garden
Resin-bound paving
Retention basin
Sponge city
Stream restoration
Sustainable city
Urban runoff
Tree box filter
Water-sensitive urban design

References

External links

SUDS solutions from the British Geological Survey
International Best Management Practices Database – Detailed data sets & summaries on performance of Urban BMPs
Portland Guide to Sustainable Stormwater – City of Portland, Oregon

Drainage
Environmental engineering
Hydrology and urban planning
Drainage system
Sustainable design
Waste treatment technology
Water pollution
Sustainable urban planning